Mohan Kumar Mangalam Football Tournament  commonly known as the  MKM Trophy,  MKM Memorial Football Tournament is a prestigious annual Indian football tournament held in Zawar  Rajasthan and organized by Hindustan Zinc (HZL) and Zawar Mines Labour Union. The tournament was first started in 1976 and is named after Mohan Kumar Mangalam. Apart from some top clubs from Rajasthan, clubs from neighbouring states, also have participated in this trophy.

The current champions are Delhi XI who defeated DFA Udaipur on 30th January 2023. After a span of 33 years a team hailing from Delhi secured this title.

Venue 
All matches are played at Zawar Stadium in Udaipur.

Results

References 

Football in Rajasthan
Football cup competitions in India
1976 establishments in India
Recurring sporting events established in 1976